The Rivière Ditton is a tributary of the rivière au Saumon. This river flows in the municipalities of Chartierville and La Patrie, in the Le Haut-Saint-François Regional County Municipality, in the administrative region of Estrie, in the province of Quebec, in Canada.

Forestry is the main economic activity in this valley; agriculture, second, especially in the lower part.

The surface of the Ditton River is usually frozen from mid-December to mid-March, except the rapids areas; however, safe circulation on the ice is generally from late December to early March.

Geography 

The hydrographic slopes neighboring the "Ditton River" are:
 north side: rivière au Saumon;
 east side: rivière au Saumon, Chesham River;
 south side: West Branch Magalloway (United States);
 west side: North Eaton River, Labbé stream.

  northwards, to the confluence of a stream (coming from the East);
  northwards, to the confluence of the Ditton East River (coming from the East);
  northwards, to the confluence of the Ditton West River (coming from the south west);
  north, to the limit of the townships of Ditton and Emberton;
  north, to a stream (coming from the East);
  north to Mining Creek (coming from the West);
  north, to its mouth.

The Ditton river flows on the south bank of the rivière au Saumon. Its confluence is located south of the route 212, southwest of the intersection of this latter route with the route 257 of the village La Patrie.

Toponymy 

The term "Ditton" is a family name of British origin.

The toponym "Ditton" was taken from the name of an important village and civil parish in the Tonbridge and Malling district of Kent, in England. This toponym is also used in Quebec to designate the Ditton East River and the Ditton West River.

The toponym "rivière Ditton" was formalized on December 5, 1968, at the Commission de toponymie du Québec.

See also 

 Saint-François River, a stream
 List of rivers of Quebec

Notes and references 

Rivers of Estrie
Le Haut-Saint-François Regional County Municipality